The 2016 Currie Cup First Division was the second tier of the second stage of the 2016 Currie Cup, the 78th edition of this annual South African rugby union competition organised by the South African Rugby Union. It was played between 12 August and 7 October 2016 and featured six teams that qualified through the 2016 Currie Cup qualification competition.

Competition rules and information

There were six participating teams in the 2016 Currie Cup First Division.

Qualification

The six franchise teams automatically qualified to the 2016 Currie Cup Premier Division, and were joined by the three highest-placed non-franchise teams from the 2016 Currie Cup qualification stage. The remaining six teams from the qualification stage qualified for the Currie Cup First Division.

Regular season and title playoffs

The six teams that qualified for the First Division played against each other over the course of the competition, either at home or away. Teams received four points for a win and two points for a draw. Bonus points were awarded to teams that scored 4 or more tries in a game, as well as to teams that lost a match by 7 points or less. Teams were ranked by log points, then points difference (points scored less points conceded).

The top four teams qualified for the semifinals, which were followed by a final.

Teams

The teams that will compete in the 2016 Currie Cup First Division are:

Standings
The final log for the 2016 Currie Cup First Division is:

Round-by-round

The table below shows a team's progression throughout the season. For each round, each team's cumulative points total is shown with the overall log position in brackets.

Matches

Five rounds of matches were played, followed by semi-finals and the final.

Round one

Round two

Round three

Round four

Round Five

Round Six

Semi-finals

Final

Honours

The honour roll for the 2016 Currie Cup First Division was as follows:

Players

Squads

The following squads were named for the 2016 Currie Cup First Division:

Appearances and points

Points scorers

The following table contain points scored in the 2016 Currie Cup First Division:

Discipline

The following table contains all the cards handed out during the tournament:

Referees

The following referees officiated matches in the 2016 Currie Cup First Division:

See also

 2016 Currie Cup Premier Division
 2016 Currie Cup qualification
 2016 Under-21 Provincial Championship
 2016 Under-20 Provincial Championship
 2016 Under-19 Provincial Championship

References

2016
2016 Currie Cup